Ernest Koliqi (20 May 190315 January 1975) was an Albanian journalist, politician, translator, teacher and writer.

Biography 

Born in Shkodra, where he also attended his first lessons at the local Jesuit College. In 1918 his father send him to study in the jesuit directed "Cesare Arici" college, in Brescia; and afterwards in Bergamo. Then at the University of Padua, and became knowledgeable in Albanian folk history. He began to write under pseudonyms, such as Hilushi, Hilush Vilza and Borizani. In the 1920s and 1930s Koliqi was the founder of leading magazines in Albania, such as the Illyria magazine, and others, which covered geography and culture in the country. He also was Minister of Education at the time of the Albanian Kingdom during World War II, when he sent two hundred teachers to establish Albanian schools in Kosovo.

As a writer many of his literary works were banned even though he had political connections, which is partly why they were banned for this very reason because of his political views. He became creative in prose, and together with Mitrush Kuteli is considered the founder of modern Albanian prose. He translated into Albanian the works of the great Italian poets: Dante Alighieri, Petrarch, Ludovico Ariosto, Torquato Tasso, Giuseppe Parini, Vincenzo Monti, and Ugo Foscolo. He distinguished himself in the translation of an anthology of Italian poetry in 1963.

In his books such as Hija e Maleve, 1929, Tregtar flamujsh, 1935, and Pasqyrat e Narçizit, 1936, Koliqi brings a unique spirituality to Albanian literature.

He died in Rome in 1975.

Works

Literary works 

Skanderbeg's Call, (1924)
The Shadow of the Mountains (1929)
The Traces of the Seasons (1933)
Flags' Merchant (1935)
The Mirrors of Narcissus (1936)
Symphony of the Eagles (1936)
The Albanian Popular Epic, PhD thesis at the University of Rome.(1937)
The Fences of the Awakening (1959)
The Taste of the Leavened Bread (1960)
Albania (1965)

Translations 
The Great Poets of Italy in two volumes, 1932 & 1935;
The Mountain Lute parts of it in Italian.

Other legacy 
 Founder and director of Shkëndija magazine,;
 Founder and publisher of Shêjzat, Rome, 1957-1973.

References 

1903 births
1975 deaths
Albanian Roman Catholics
Albanian translators
20th-century translators
Albanian–Italian translators
Italian–Albanian translators
Albanian dramatists and playwrights
20th-century Albanian poets
Albanian-language poets
20th-century dramatists and playwrights
Albanian publishers (people)
Government ministers of Albania
Education ministers of Albania
Speakers of the Parliament of Albania
Members of the Parliament of Albania
Albanian collaborators with Fascist Italy
Albanian expatriates in Italy
Albanian literary critics
Italian literary critics
People from Shkodër
People from Scutari vilayet
University of Padua alumni